Justices of the Peace Act is a stock short title used in New Zealand and the United Kingdom for legislation relating to justices of the peace.

List

New Zealand
The Justices of the Peace Act 1858 (21 & 22 Vict No 27)
 The Justices of the Peace Act 1957 (1957 No 89)

United Kingdom
The Justices of the Peace Act 1361 (34 Edw 3 c 1)
The Justices of the Peace Act 1547 (1 Edw 6 c 7)
The Justices of the Peace Act 1867 (30 & 31 Vict c 115)
The Justices of the Peace Act 1906 (6 Edw 7 c 16)
The Justices of the Peace Act 1949 (12, 13 & 14 Geo 6 c 101)
The Justices of the Peace Act 1965 (c 28)
The Justices of the Peace Act 1968 (c 69)
The Justices of the Peace Act 1979 (c 55)
The Justices of the Peace Act 1997 (c 25)

The Justices Qualification Acts 1731 to 1875 was the collective title of the following Acts:
The Justices Qualification Act 1731 (5 Geo 2 c 18)
The Justices Qualification Act 1744 (18 Geo 2 c 20)
The Justices Qualification Act 1760 (1 Geo 3 c 13)
The Justices Qualification (Scilly Islands) Act 1834 (4 & 5 Will 4 c 43)
The Justices Qualification Act 1871 (34 & 35 Vict c 18)
The Justices Qualification Act 1875 (38 & 39 Vict c 54)

See also
List of short titles

References

Lists of legislation by short title
Justices of the peace